Riverside Brookfield High School (RBHS) is a secondary school located directly between Riverside, Illinois, and Brookfield, Illinois, which educates grades 9-12. It serves the towns of Riverside, North Riverside, Broadview, and parts of LaGrange Park and Brookfield. Its campus is adjacent to Brookfield Zoo. The mascot of Riverside Brookfield (RB) is Rouser the Bulldog. Riverside Brookfield Township High School District 208 passed a $58 million referendum, resulting in renovations to the school building, including a new swimming pool, athletics stadium, and classrooms. This was completed in Spring 2010. In 2015, the Board of Education used $14 million to address health/safety concerns and to build a new athletic complex.

Academics 

Riverside Brookfield's class of 2012 had an average composite ACT score of 23.1, 2.3 points above the state average. 95% of the senior class has graduated over the past eight years. Riverside Brookfield ranks in the Top 8% of Illinois high schools in PSAE rankings, and the Top 7% of Illinois high schools in ACT ranking. The school was ranked by the Chicago Sun-Times in 2010 as the 40th best high school in Illinois, and 9th in Illinois (194th nationally) by Newsweek in 2011.

The school offers 22 honors-level courses and 24 Advanced Placement courses, including Music Theory, Art History, Computer Science, Language and Composition, Biology, Calculus AB and BC, Microeconomics, and US Government and Politics. Riverside Brookfield ranked 5th in Illinois (239th nationally) in the 2011 Washington Post Challenge Index.

Notable alumni
 Lee Phillip Bell was an American soap opera writer, American television talk show host, and Soap opera producer co-creating The Bold and the Beautiful, and The Young and the Restless with her husband
 Tom Baugh was an NFL center (1986—89),  playing most of his career with the Kansas City Chiefs.
 Michael Colgrass (1949) is a composer who won the 1978 Pulitzer Prize for Music and an Emmy Award in 1982 for a PBS documentary Soundings: The Music of Michael Colgrass.
 Bob Daily (1978) is an author, producer, and award-winning television writer.  He received two awards from the Writers Guild of America for his work on the television series Frasier, and later he became a producer for the series Desperate Housewives.
 Jack Dykinga (1961) is an author and photojournalist who won the 1971 Pulitzer Prize for feature photography.
 Tom Kondla was a professional basketball center playing the 1968—69 season, mostly with the ABA Houston Mavericks. 
 Dana Rettke (2017) is former Wisconsin Badgers Volleyball player and National Champion and currently playing professionally in Italy for Monza.
 Owen Murphy (2022) is a baseball pitcher for the Atlanta Braves.

References

Riverside, Illinois
Brookfield, Illinois
Public high schools in Cook County, Illinois
School districts in Cook County, Illinois